Shelley Niro  (born 1954) is a Mohawk filmmaker and visual artist from New York and Ontario. She is known for her photographs using herself and female family members cast in contemporary positions to challenge the stereotypes and clichés of Native American women.

A multidisciplinary contemporary artist skilled in photography, painting, sculpting, beadwork, multimedia, and independent film, Niro is a member of the Turtle clan of the Kanienkehaka (Mohawk Nation) from Six Nations of the Grand River.

Early life and education 
Shelley Niro was born in Niagara Falls, New York and grew up on the Six Nations of the Grand River Reserve, near Brantford, Ontario, Canada.

Niro's home life made it easy for creativity to flourish while entertaining her siblings through songs, storytelling, and picture drawing. Niro's family had a big impact on her work, and would later make appearances in various compositions. Niro's artistic ambitions began with her earning a diploma in performing arts from Cambrian College in Sudbury, Ontario, in 1972. In 1990, she received an honors fine arts degree in painting and sculpture from Ontario College of Art. Niro went on to earn a master of fine arts from the University of Western Ontario in 1997. In 2000, Niro attended the Banff Centre for the Arts to study film.

Art career 
Niro explored the oral history of the Haudenosaunee people in general and the diaspora of Mohawk people in particular. She is known for her photography, which often combines portraits of living Native women with customary Mohawk imagery. She uses herself, friends, and family members as models. Her 1992 photographic series, This Land Is Mime Land and 500 Year Itch employ humorous pop culture references, such as Elvis Presley and Marilyn Monroe. Niro often works in diptychs and triptychs, using photographic processes such as photo montage, hand tints, and sepia tones.

Shelly Niro is often compared to the artist Cindy Sherman because they both cast themselves in different roles in an attempt to break down various stereotypes. Niro, however, never fully disguises herself. "She wants the viewer to recognize her within her manifestations."

As her skills advanced, Niro would feature family members in her art pieces. Her piece Time Travels Through Us shows her mother and two of her sisters as a way to represent the social, cultural, and personal values passed from generation to generation. The colors purple and silver reference Iroquois aesthetics and culture. A turtle represents Niro's spirit animal, as well as being a reference to the Turtle Clan of which she is a member.

Most of Niro's work is conceptual, touching on themes of gender imbalance, cultural appropriation, and the importance of cultural influences. She uses the immersion of different mediums to engage her audience with her perspective. In spite of the serious themes such as cultural loss and oppression, some of Niro's pieces have used humor and satire as a form of resistance to convey social misconceptions about her culture while poking fun at outdated stereotypes and ideas.

Personal life 
Niro currently resides in Brantford, Ontario, with her husband.

Group exhibitions 

 1999: Across Borders: Beadwork in Iroquois Life, McCord Museum, Montreal, Quebec
 2019: Hearts of Our People: Native Women Artists, Minneapolis Institute of Art, Minneapolis, MN

Film and video
Niro's first film was It Starts With a Whisper, which she co-directed with Anna Gronau in 1992. Other films include:
 Kissed by Lightning (2009), producer, director 
 The Flying Head (2008), director
 The Shirt (2003), director; stars Hulleah Tsinhnahjinnie
 Honey Moccasin (1998), director; stars Tantoo Cardinal
 Overweight with Crooked Teeth (1997), producer, director
 It Starts with a Whisper (1993), producer, director
1992, Niro directed her first short film “It Starts With a Whisper” with co-director Anna Gronau. In this film, Niro wanted to discuss the issues of gender, Native identity, and colonialism. Niro was able to showcase her unconventional narrative and performance elements using satire, burlesque, and music tracing back to her heritage to convey her perspective as a Native American.

1997,  Niro directed the film “Overweight With Crooked Teeth” which was meant to poke fun at the common misconceptions and stereotypes of the “Aboriginal Warrior”. In most of her works, Niro likes to play with masquerade, parody, and appropriation while calling out inconsistencies.

1998, Niro directed the film “Honey Moccasin” featuring Tantoo Cardinal and Billy Merasty. This film won “Best Experimental Work” at the Dreamspeakers Festival in Edmonton and “Best Feature” at Red Earth Film Festival in Oklahoma.

2003, Niro's film “The Shirt”, featuring actor Hulleah Tsinhnahjinnie, was exhibited in the Venice Biennale along with her photography pieces, and was later presented in the 2004 Sundance Film Festival in Park City, Utah.

At the 2007 Venice Biennale, Niro's film “Tree” was paired alongside performance art by fellow Native artist, Lori Blondeau, for the Requickening Project, which represents long term collaborations between the indigenous peoples of the Americas and the city of Venice.

2009, with support of Telefilm Canada, Niro was able to direct and produce her first film, “Kissed By Lightning” starring Kateri Walker and Eric Schweig about a Mohawk painter in a state of grief. The film premiered at the imagineNATIVE Film + Media Arts Festival, and went on to win the Santa Fe Film Festival's 2009 “Milagro Award for Best Indigenous Film”.

Awards and recognition
The National Museum of American History named Niro a fellow in 1997. She won the Walking in Beauty Award for her 1992 production It Starts With a Whisper.  The film Honey Moccasin won Best Experimental Work at the Dreamspeakers Festival in Edmonton, Alberta and Best Feature, Best Actress, Best Actor, and Best Director at the Red Earth Festival in Oklahoma City, Oklahoma. She was made a member of the Royal Canadian Academy of Arts. Her short film The Shirt was presented at the 2003 Venice Biennale and the 2004 Sundance Film Festival in Park City, UT.  Niro was awarded a Governor General's Award in Visual and Media Arts in 2017.

Niro's art has been featured in several exhibitions and museums across Canada and the United States, including the National Museum of the American Indian (NMAI). Her artistic achievements have also earned Niro fellowships and residencies at major educational and cultural institutions, and the honor of being “Guest Selector” for the NMAI's “Native American Film + Video Festival”.

Niro participated in prominent exhibitions at the Venice Biennale. In 2003, Niro was the exhibition artist for the Indigenous Arts Action Alliance (IA3) showcasing her photography work, as well as her short film “The Shirt” which was later screened at the 2004 Sundance Film Festival.

Niro received two awards for the film “Honey Moccasin” which she directed in 1998. This film won “Best Experimental Work” at the Dreamspeakers Festival in Edmonton, and “Best Feature” at the Red Earth Film Festival in Oklahoma.

In 2009, Niro received the “Milagro Award for Best Indigenous Film” for “Kissed by Lightning” at the Santa Fe Film Festival.

She won the Scotiabank Photography Award in 2017. In 2020, she was awarded the Paul de Hueck and Norman Walford Career Achievement Award for Art Photography for outstanding achievement in the field of photography.

In 2020, Niro received the Paul de Hueck and Norman Walford Career Achievement Award.

Quotations 
"Some people think that to be Indian, you have to do certain things, but I'm saying that you're Indian no matter what you do, but you have to decide what you want to do and you have to ask questions, like, am I doing something because it's expected of me to do, or am I doing it because I really believe this and it's really a part of me. So I'm always questioning that, saying, "Am I being truthful to myself? How much a part of what I do is part of my psychology?" —Shelley Niro

Notes

References
 Ryan, Allan J. The Trickster Shift: Humour and Irony in Contemporary Native Art. Victoria: University of British Columbia Press, 1999. .

External links
Official website
Interview with Shelley Niro by Larry Abbott

Shelley Niro, Vision Project, by Ryan Rice

Living people
1954 births
Canadian Mohawk people
First Nations painters
First Nations photographers
First Nations filmmakers
People from Niagara Falls, New York
People from the County of Brant
University of Western Ontario alumni
Canadian women painters
Members of the Royal Canadian Academy of Arts
21st-century Canadian women artists
Native American women artists
Six Nations of the Grand River
21st-century American women
Governor General's Award in Visual and Media Arts winners
First Nations women
First Nations women artists